Ibobang is a village in Ngatpang, Palau. It consists of a roughly linear settlement, farmland, and a marina.

References

Ngatpang
Populated places in Palau